The girls' Super-G competition of the 2020 Winter Youth Olympics was held at the Les Diablerets Alpine Centre, Switzerland, on Friday, 10 January.

Results

The race was started at 10:15.

References

Girls' Super-G